Richard Archdall was an Irish politician in the last decade of the 19th Century and the first decade of the 20th.

Archdall was educated at Harrow School and Trinity College, Dublin. He was a Tory MP in the Irish House of Commons for Ardfert in County Kerry from 1790 until 1798 and then Killibegs in County Donegal from 1798 until 1801. He was then MP for Kilkenny from March to July 1802 and for Dundalk from then until 1806.

References

People educated at Harrow School
Alumni of Trinity College Dublin
Irish MPs 1790–1797
Irish MPs 1798–1800
UK MPs 1801–1802
UK MPs 1802–1806
Members of the Parliament of Ireland (pre-1801) for County Kerry constituencies
Members of the Parliament of Ireland (pre-1801) for County Donegal constituencies
Members of the Parliament of the United Kingdom for County Kilkenny constituencies (1801–1922)
Members of the Parliament of the United Kingdom for County Louth constituencies (1801–1922)
Tory MPs (pre-1834)